Parkwood High School is located in Monroe, North Carolina, USA. It opened in August 1961. It is part of the Union County Public Schools district. It is adjacent to Parkwood Middle School with feeder elementary schools Prospect Elementary School, Waxhaw Elementary School, and Western Union Elementary School. The principal is Tracy Strickland.

Facilities 
Parkwood High School gym was opened on August 10, 2007. Due to the overcrowding of the towns and schools, North Carolina has added trailers to Parkwood High School, as well as many other schools in Union County.

Parkwood High School currently has a newspaper called the Parkwood Blueprint. It also has a yearly literary magazine.

Parkwood has recently added a research/portfolio graduation project starting for the class of 2010. As seniors, they will have to present a portfolio and presentation that will meet the NCGP requirements in the fall of the year. Students will start this project in the first semester of their junior year in high school and will work on it through the time to present it. This project will determine 50% of their grade for English 4 and is now a graduation requirement.

Air Force Junior ROTC 
The Air Force Junior ROTC, also known as Aerospace Science program, was created in 2007. It is designed as a four-year program, but students are allowed to take any number of years. The classes are structured as normal classes, but there is an extra emphasis on leadership activities, and some cadet activities are also introduced.

Controversy
In 2010, a female teacher of Spanish was arrested and accused of having sex with a male student.

On July 7, 2020, the Union County Board of Education voted 6–2 to change the school mascot from the Rebels to a new mascot. Wolf Pack was the mascot that would eventually be chosen, and also serve as the new teamname for the school.

Notable alumni 
 Julianna Cannamela (c/o 2015), artistic gymnast
 Daniel Harvey (c/o 2001), professional soccer player
 Carroll McCray (c/o 1979), college football coach
 John Tillman (c/o 1983), American triple jumper who represented the United States at the 1992 Summer Olympics

References

External links 
 Parkwood High School website
 Union County Public Schools
 Parkwood High School
 Parkwood Rebels Football

Educational institutions established in 1961
Public high schools in North Carolina
Schools in Union County, North Carolina
1961 establishments in North Carolina